The Union Public School District is a public school district based in Union, Mississippi (USA).

The district covers south central Neshoba and northwestern Newton counties.

Schools
The district operates a single school that is split into three campuses – Elementary, Middle, and High.

Demographics

2006-07 school year
There were a total of 917 students enrolled in the Union Public School District during the 2006–2007 school year. The gender makeup of the district was 50% female and 50% male. The racial makeup of the district was 28.03% African American, 70.82% White, 0.65% Hispanic, 0.22% Asian, and 0.22% Native American. 49.3% of the district's students were eligible to receive free lunch.

Previous school years

Accountability statistics

See also
List of school districts in Mississippi

References

External links
 

Education in Neshoba County, Mississippi
Education in Newton County, Mississippi
School districts in Mississippi